Roseobacter litoralis  is a species of aerobic pink-pigmented bacteria. It contains Bacteriochlorophyll a. It contains spheroidenone, does not synthesize bacteriochlorophyll anaerobically, but shows aerobic phototrophic activity. It is also considered a photosynthetic marine bacterium.  Cells are ovoid or rod-shaped and motile by subpolar flagella. R. litoralis does not reduce nitrate, while R. dentrificans does. R. litoralis can be found in marine seaweed.

References

Further reading

External links
Type strain of Roseobacter litoralis at BacDive -  the Bacterial Diversity Metadatabase

Thermophiles
Rhodobacteraceae